Carl Lutz (30 March 1895 – 12 February 1975) was a Swiss diplomat. He served as the Swiss Vice-Consul in Budapest, Hungary, from 1942 until the end of World War II. He is credited with saving over 62,000 Jews during the Second World War in a very large rescue operation.

Due to his actions, half of the Jewish population of Budapest survived and was not deported to Nazi extermination camps during the Holocaust. He was awarded the title of Righteous Among the Nations by Yad Vashem.

Early life and education 
Lutz was born on 30 March 1895 to Johannes and Ursula Lutz in Walzenhausen, Switzerland, in the mountains of the canton of Appenzell in the northeast of Switzerland, and attended local schools. His father owned a sandstone quarry. In 1909 when he was 14 years old his mother died of tuberculosis.  At the age of 15 he began working in an apprenticeship in a textile mill in St. Margrethen.

He immigrated in 1913 at the age of 18 to the United States, where he lived and worked for more than 20 years. He worked in Granite City, Illinois, from 1913–18 to earn money for college, and started his studies at Central Wesleyan College in Warrenton, Missouri, from 1918–20.

In 1920, Lutz found a job in the Swiss consular corps at the Swiss Legation in Washington, D.C. He continued his education there at George Washington University, where he received a bachelor's degree in 1924. During his time in Washington, D.C., Lutz lived in Dupont Circle. He continued to work for the Swiss Legation.

Lutz was a Methodist.

Diplomatic career 
In 1926, Lutz was appointed as chancellor at the Swiss Consulate in Philadelphia, United States. He next was assigned to the Swiss Consulate in St. Louis, and served in total from 1926 to 1934 in the two cities.

In 1934, he met his first wife, Gertrud Fankhauser, and they married in January 1935.  Lutz left the United States after more than 20 years.  He was assigned in January 1935 as vice-consul to the Swiss Consulate General in Jaffa, in what was then Mandatory Palestine. In 1936, from their apartment he and his wife saw an unarmed Jew being lynched by an Arab crowd. He served there until 1942.

Actions during the Second World War 

Appointed in 1942 as Swiss vice-consul in Budapest, Hungary, Lutz soon began cooperating with the Jewish Agency for Israel. He issued Swiss safe-conduct documents that enabled almost 10,000 Hungarian Jewish children to emigrate, and saved over 62,000 Jews.

Once the Nazis took over Budapest in 1944, they began deporting Jews to the death camps.  Lutz negotiated a special deal with the Hungarian government and the Nazis.  He gained permission to issue protective letters to 8,000 Hungarian Jews for emigration to Palestine.

Lutz deliberately used his permission for 8,000 as applying to families rather than individuals, and proceeded to issue tens of thousands of additional protective letters, all of them bearing a number between one and 8,000. He also set up some 76 "safe houses" around Budapest, declaring them annexes of the Swiss legation and thus off-limits to Hungarian forces or Nazi soldiers. Among the safe houses was the now well known "Glass House" (Üvegház) at Vadász Street 29. About 3,000 Hungarian Jews found refuge at the Glass House and in a neighboring building.

One day, in front of the fascist Arrow Cross Party militiamen while they fired at Jews, Lutz jumped in the Danube River to save a bleeding Jewish woman along the quay that today bears his name in Budapest (Carl Lutz Rakpart). With water up to his chest and covering his suit, the consul swam back to the bank with her and asked to speak to the Hungarian officer in charge of the firing squad. Declaring the wounded woman a foreign citizen protected by Switzerland and quoting international covenants, the Swiss consul brought her back to his car in front of the stunned fascists and left quietly. Fearing to shoot at this tall man who seemed to be important and spoke so eloquently, no one dared to stop him.

Together with other diplomats of neutral countries, such as Raoul Wallenberg, appointed at the Swedish embassy, Carlos de Liz-Texeira Branquinho and Sampaio Garrido at the Portuguese Embassy, Angelo Rotta, the Apostolic nuncio of the Holy See; Angel Sanz Briz, the Spanish Minister, later followed by Giorgio Perlasca, an Italian businessman working at the Spanish embassy, and Friedrich Born, the Swiss delegate of the International Committee of the Red Cross, Lutz worked relentlessly for many months to prevent the planned deaths of innocent people. He and his colleagues dodged the actions of their German and Hungarian counterparts. Thanks to his diplomatic skills, Lutz succeeded in persuading Hungarian and Nazi German officials, among them Adolf Eichmann, to tolerate, at least in part, his formal protection of Hungarian Jews. Lutz's efforts to undermine the Nazi genocide were so bold and so extensive that, in November 1944, Proconsul Edmund Veesenmayer, the German representative in Hungary, asked permission to assassinate the Swiss Consul; Berlin never answered.

The Swiss Minister, Maximilian Jaeger, supported Lutz until his departure at his government's orders as the Soviet Army approached in late 1944. In the last weeks before the Red Army took the city, Lutz was helped by Harald Feller, who took over responsibility of the Swiss legation after Jaeger's departure. Lutz's wife Gertrud ('Trudi') notably played a central supporting role during the whole period of her husband's activities in Budapest.

After the Second World War 
Carl Lutz and his wife returned to Switzerland in January 1945 and divorced in 1946, and in 1949 he re-married, to Magda Csányi, who during the war had asked him to protect her and her daughter, Agnes. He retired in 1961. From 1945–54 he was stationed in Berne and Zurich, Section for Foreign Interests of the Federal Political Department, and from 1952–61 he was Consul General in Bregenz, Austria.

Lutz died in Bern, Switzerland, in 1975.

Legacy and honours 
Lutz saved the lives of tens of thousands of people.  As in the case of Paul Grüninger, however, his achievements were not immediately recognized in Switzerland. Soon after the war, he was first criticized by the Swiss government for having exceeded his authority, as officials were fearful of endangering Switzerland's neutral status. Many years later, in 1958, as part of Swiss national rethinking of the war years, Lutz was "rehabilitated" in terms of public reputation, and his achievements were honored.

 1963, a street in Haifa, Israel, was named after him, which runs from the railway station to the northernmost point of the Bat Galim neighborhood. 
 1965, Lutz was the first Swiss national named to the list of "Righteous Among the Nations" by Yad Vashem, Israel's memorial to the Holocaust.
 Lutz was decorated with the Cross of Honor, Order of Merit of the Federal Republic of Germany.
 1991, a memorial dedicated to him was erected at the entrance to the old Budapest ghetto (see photo above).
 1998, Lutz appeared on an Israeli postage stamp along with four other "Righteous Among the Nations".
 2014, George Washington University in Washington, D.C., posthumously honored Lutz with the President's Medal in a ceremony attended by various international dignitaries and his step-daughter Agnes Hirschi.
 His name has been included in The Raoul Wallenberg-memorial at the Dohány Street Synagogue in Budapest (see photo above).
 In 2017, a scenic lookout built in his memory was dedicated in Switzerland Forest, near Tiberias, the Sea of Galilee, and the Golan Heights.
 In 2018, a meeting room in the West Wing of the Federal Palace of Switzerland in Bern, Switzerland, was renamed the Carl Lutz room.
 The Carl Lutz Society promotes his legacy

See also 
 Walking with the Enemy
 Shoes on the Danube Bank
Ambassador Carl Lutz and Franz Brozincevic Wetzikon FBW-bus - Wikipedia Swiss PTT Passenger FBW/Saurer car before the Embassy in Budapest with Ambassador Carl Lutz to the right. The bus is equipped with wood gasifier, special diplomatic licence plates and special "dark" lights (e.g. following the Verdunkelungs-V. vom 23.05.1939 (Deutsches Reich)).

Notes and references

Bibliography 
  Luca Bernardi, "Le diplomate courage" (subtitle: "Carl Lutz, vice-consul de Suisse à Budapest entre 1942 et 1945, a mis au point une stratégie ayant permis de sauver plus de 62 000 Juifs. Une exposition dans sa ville natale est consacrée à cet homme quasi oublié"), Le Temps, 4 September 2013, p. 28.

Literature 
  Theo Tschuy: Carl Lutz und die Juden von Budapest. NZZ Libro, Zürich 1999, .
  Erika Rosenberg: Das Glashaus: Carl Lutz und die Rettung ungarischer Juden vor dem Holocaust. Herbig, München 2016, .

External links 

 
 Biography
 Carl Lutz Foundation, Budapest
 Carl Lutz – Holocaust Heroes Budapest
 The forgotten Swiss diplomat who rescued thousands from Holocaust, BBC News

Swiss Righteous Among the Nations
Swiss diplomats
Swiss Methodists
Jewish Hungarian history
Swiss expatriates in Hungary
Swiss emigrants to the United States
Central Wesleyan College (Missouri) alumni
George Washington University alumni
People from Appenzell Ausserrhoden
1895 births
1975 deaths
Commanders Crosses of the Order of Merit of the Federal Republic of Germany
People from Dupont Circle
People who rescued Jews during the Holocaust